The Gueltara Mountains are a small mountain range in western Algeria. The mountain summit sits at an elevation of 755 metres.

Notes

Mountain ranges of Algeria